Calonne-Ricouart is a commune in the Pas-de-Calais department in the Hauts-de-France region of France.

Geography

History
The village and the old castle were burned down in 1537 by the troops of Francis I.  
The church of St. Pierre was rebuilt between the years 1763 to 1781. In 1786, a new chateau was built at the present location of the cemetery.
Around the same time, through the initiative of Bernard Calonne, the watermill was built on the north bank of the river Clarence. It was sold during the Revolution and ceased functioning as a working mill in 1945. Nowadays, only a small part of the original building still exists.

Features
The spoil heaps from the years of mining coal are now disappearing, as they contain material which can be used in road building.
To the east of the town, were once the pit heads stood, is Park Calonnix, which covers 35 hectares of land including 15 hectares of forest and 5 hectares of ponds. Various sports and leisure activities are available (tennis, squash, horseriding, a climbing wall, pedal boats, freshwater and trout fishing, an inflatable playground and an animal park. Also located on the site, in the former coal mining explosives store, is a bat sanctuary.

Population

Places of interest
 The church of St. Pierre, dating from the eighteenth century.
 The modern church of St.Paul.
 An old farm and a watermill.

Notable people
 Robert Budzynski (born 1940), football player
 Maryan Synakowski (1936–2022), football player
 Maryan Wisniewski (born 1937), football player

See also
Communes of the Pas-de-Calais department

References

External links

 Official website of the commune 
 The leisure park 

Calonnericouart